The 1994 European Athletics Indoor Championships were held in Paris, the capital city of France in between 11 and 13 March 1994. This was the last edition to feature race walking.

Medal summary

Men

Women

Medal table

 Athletes of the Federal Republic of Yugoslavia competed as Independent European Participants (IEP).

Participating nations

 (2)
 (8)
 (12)
 (18)
 (1)
 (13)
 (2)
 (1)
 (18)
 (4)
 (4)
 (10)
 (47)
 (1)
 (55)
 (31)
 (11)
 (10)
Independent European Participants (3)
 (2)
 (3)
 (4)
 (29)
 (6)
 (3)
 (1)
 (6)
 (12)
 (7)
 (13)
 (9)
 (21)
 (42)
 (6)
 (4)
 (25)
 (24)
 (9)
 (4)
 (18)

See also
1994 in athletics (track and field)

External links
 Results - men at GBRathletics.com
 Results - women at GBRathletics.com
 EAA

 
European Athletics Indoor Championships
European Indoor Championships in Athletics
European Indoor Championships in Athletics
A
Athletics in Paris
March 1994 sports events in Europe
1994 in Paris
International sports competitions hosted by Paris